Waritchaphum is a district (amphoe) in the province of Sakon Nakhon, Thailand.

Geography
Neighboring districts are (from the north clockwise) Sawang Daen Din, Phang Khon, Nikhom Nam Un, Wang Sam Mo of Udon Thani province, and Song Dao.

History
The minor district (king amphoe) was established on 1 April 1926 as a subordinate of Phanna Nikhom district, consisting of the tambons Waritchaphum and Pla Lo split off from Phanna Nikhom District and Kham Bo and Nong Lat from Ban Han (now Sawang Daen Din) District. It was upgraded to a full district on 10 March 1953.

Administration 
The district is divided into five sub-districts (tambons), which are further subdivided into 71 villages (mubans). Waritchaphum is the only township (thesaban tambon) of the district, covering parts of tambon Waritchaphum. There are a further five tambon administrative organizations (TAO).

References

External links
amphoe.com

Waritchaphum